Elizabeth Rose "Liz" Ralston (born 16 May 1995) is an Australian football (soccer) player, who plays for Western Sydney Wanderers in the Australian W-League. She has previously played for Sydney FC. She also works as a physiotherapist.

Ralston started playing soccer from the age of seven and made her debut for Sydney FC at the age of 17, in the 2012–13 season. In 2019, she received a call up to the national team.

In September 2021, Ralston left Sydney FC, after 9 years at the club. A few months after leaving Sydney FC, Ralston joined cross-town rivals Western Sydney Wanderers. At the end of the season she left the club and joined APIA Leichhardt.

References

1995 births
Living people
Australian women's soccer players
Sydney FC (A-League Women) players
Western Sydney Wanderers FC (A-League Women) players
A-League Women players
Women's association football defenders